The Oluwa surname is of African origin.  It is the Yoruba word for God.

Notable people 
 Rafiu Oluwa (1931–2009), Nigerian sprinter
 Mojisola Oluwa (1973–), Nigerian weightlifter

Deities 
 Orisa Oluwa, a deity in the Yoruba religion

References

See also 
 Olu, a diminutive of Oluwa as a given name

Yoruba-language surnames